César Herrera Rodríguez (born 5 October 1930) is a Mexican basketball player. He competed in the men's tournament at the 1960 Summer Olympics.

References

External links

1930 births
Possibly living people
Mexican men's basketball players
Olympic basketball players of Mexico
Basketball players at the 1960 Summer Olympics
Basketball players from Chihuahua
Sportspeople from Ciudad Juárez